Lake George is a small lake in Anoka County, Minnesota, located within the city of Oak Grove,  north of the city of Anoka.  Minnesota's Department of Natural Resources tracks the lake by the name George and the identifier 02-0091-00. The USGS tracks the lake by the ID 644081 and the coordinates of 

Roughly circular in shape with two marshes encircling Greenwald Island on the Southern shore, Lake George Regional Park covers much of the North shore. The park has picnic areas, a boat launch, and a large roped-off swimming beach.  The lake is used during the summer and winter for water skiing, fishing, ice fishing, canoeing, and snowmobiling.  With the exception of a few vacant lots, a wetland area in the southeast corner at the lake outlet, a new development on the west end, and the County property, there are homes located along the entire lake.

The regions around the lake are known as: Paradise Alley, Beaver Shores, Lake George Regional Park, Cattail Oak, Shady Oak, South Bay, Greenwald Island, Indian Ridge Road.

History
Lake George was formed about 12,000 years ago following retreat of the Laurentide Ice Sheet and drainage of glacial Lake Anoka.  The first recorded mention of the lake comes from an Indian battle which occurred in 1845. The battle followed a peace conference between the Lakota and the Ojibway at Fort Snelling. Following the conference, the Ojibway began returning home up the Mississippi River and then up the Rum River, and the Lakota set on their way up the Minnesota River. It is reported that the Ojibway took a Lakota woman with them and when the Lakota discovered this they pursued the Ojibway to their camp on the south shore of Lake George. The battle that ensued lasted for three days and resulted in over 200 dead.

In 1847, Federal surveyors established the section and township boundaries as well as locations of Indian burial mounds. The lake is named after George Arbuckle, who was the chief surveyor of the party.  The original survey plats of lake George and Greenwald Island were published in 1848.

After the settlement of the area, Lake George began to become popular for urban dwellers looking to find summer recreation. By the turn of the century, many cabins and, just prior to World War I, a few resorts were built. Vacationers first came by rail via the depot in Cedar and later by car. The main resorts on the lake were Hopper's (northwest shore), Yost's (North shore), Tillbergs (now the Shoreside), Day's (later the By George Inn) and Fleet's Inn (northshore).  Fleet's Inn was located not too far from the present day county beach. It was said that gangsters from nearby St. Paul would check in when the heat was on in town. The Chicago mob would occasionally visit them to make business deals.

Greenwald Island is named after Aaron Greenwald, who was born December 2, 1832, and eventually settled in Anoka where he found work as a miller in one of the local flour mills. Aaron and wife, Ann, had two sons: William born August 8, 1859, and Louis on Oct 10, 1860.  It is possible that Aaron was the first man to enlist for the Union cause.

In the late 1930s the Lake George Conservation Club was formed. At the time most of the lakeshore residents were seasonal. In the 1970s the face of the lake's neighborhoods began to change with permanent homes replacing the summer cabins. The clubs activities began to dwindle until 1981 when an issue regarding horsepower regulation on the lake united the lake's residents and the club was reconstituted. In the summer of 1998 there was a dead body found in the lake.

In January 2004, the two marshes were dredged to open a channel.

Ecology

About  or 80% of the lake is classified as littoral (<15’ deep). However, since Lake George exhibits very clear water, plants grow to a deeper depth in the lake. Lake George in an oval shaped lake with two dredged channels on the south side. Most of the lake has a sandy bottom, but there are areas of soft muddy sediments. The shoreline length is 4.5 miles. Lake George Regional Park, an Anoka County park, is located on the north side of the lake. The public access is within the park. Twenty-eight (28) different species of aquatic plant life were found in the lake.

Sport fish
Lake George is known to have:
Walleye of unknown abundance and average size.  Walleye were first stocked in 2001 and these fish generally become acceptable to Metro-area anglers after their third summer (2004).
Northern Pike of above average abundance, average size and some larger pike.
Largemouth Bass of average abundance, all sizes present including some real trophies.
Bluegill of above average abundance, average size.
Crappie of above average abundance, average size.

Milfoil
Eurasian watermilfoil, which is scientifically known as Myriophyllum spicatum, was first confirmed in Lake George in 1998 by a DNR biologist and as of the summer of 2006 is forming nuisance mats in large areas of the lake; the native plant community and recreational use of the lake is threatened by the spread of this invasive exotic species.  In addition to Eurasian watermilfoil, curly-leaf pondweed (8 locations), another non-native species is also in Lake George. However, August is not the best time to conduct a survey for curly-leaf pondweed. It should be surveyed earlier in the season.

Because Lake George exhibits very clear conditions, it may be more prone to the spread of milfoil to deeper water.  The average Secchi disk transparency from 2000 -2005 ranged from 9.0 – 11.5 feet (CLMP data).  With the clear water, light can penetrate into deeper waters and promote plant growth beyond the 15’ depth. Milfoil was recorded on the data sheets only if it was found at the survey point.

Lake improvement district
After a majority of the property owners within the proposed Lake George Improvement District filed a petition with Anoka County requesting the establishment of the improvement district, the Oak Grove's City Council unanimously approved the creation of a "Lake Improvement District" (LID) on January 26, 2009.  The LID will further extend the efforts of the Lake George Conservation Club to keep the lake clear of invasive weeds.  An initial Board was appointed in March 2009.

Nearby communities
Lake George is located within the city of Oak Grove.  Other nearby communities include Anoka, Cedar, East Bethel, and St. Francis.

See also
 List of Minnesota aquatic plants

References

Uncited references
 Oak Grove residents oppose Lake George senior housing, townhomes, Anoka County Union, February 26, 2004
 Letter to the Editor about Eminent Domain issues, Renee Beckum, February 27, 2004, Anoka County Union
 1996 Lake George History Update by Will Ridge

External links

Minnesota DNR entry on Lake George
Lake George Regional Park Web Site
St. Francis Government Web Site
DNR's web page on milfoil

George
George
Tourist attractions in Anoka County, Minnesota